Arline Généreux (1897 – 1987) was a Canadian artist.

Her work is included in the collections of the Musée national des beaux-arts du Québec and the National Gallery of Canada.

References

1897 births
1987 deaths
20th-century Canadian women artists